Gualtherus Johannes Kolff (Rotterdam, 31 January 1846 – The Hague, 14 October 1918) was the founder of the Dutch Library for the Blind.

References

External links
 NLBB (archive.org)

Education for the blind
1846 births
1918 deaths
People from Rotterdam